Troy Duncan Gamble (born April 7, 1967) is a Canadian former ice hockey goaltender. He played 72 games for the Vancouver Canucks of the National Hockey League (NHL) from 1987 until 1992, as well as several teams in the minor league American Hockey League and International Hockey League until 1996. He was selected by the Canucks in the 1985 NHL Entry Draft while playing junior for the Medicine Hat Tigers of the Western Hockey League.

Career 
After winning the WHL Top Goaltender Award in the Western Hockey League for 1984-85 and being named a WHL All-Star First Team after leading the WHL in shutouts and GAA (2.86) while playing for the Medicine Hat Tigers, Gamble was drafted by the Vancouver Canucks in the second round, 25th overall, in the 1985 draft.  Gamble would play another junior season for Medicine Hat before being traded mid year to the Spokane Chiefs during the 86–87 season.  He would also make his NHL debut for Vancouver on November 22, 1986, a 5–2 loss to the Edmonton Oilers. Vancouver returned him to juniors for the 87–88 season to allow him more playing time and to gain more experience before beginning his NHL career. At 19 years, 229 days at the time of his debut, Gamble was the youngest goaltender in franchise history.

In the summer of 1988, the Canucks sent the 21-year-old Gamble and Jack McIlhargey to Russia to support a relationship that would later result in Soviet stars Igor Larionov and Vladimir Krutov joining the Canucks. Gamble endured rigorous off-season training with Dynamo Moscow for two weeks and another two weeks with Spartak.

Gamble's NHL career began well, as in his rookie season of 1990-91 he would post a 16-16-6 record and a 3.45 GAA, while appearing in 47 games, outplaying incumbent starter Kirk McLean, who posted a 10-22-3 record with a 3.99 GAA. Gamble would even start in the post-season for the Canucks playing a memorable Smythe Division semifinals match-up against the Los Angeles Kings. However, due to reoccurring concussion problems Gamble's career was derailed from PCS symptoms including nausea and recurring headaches.

Gamble spent the majority of his career in the minors. He played for 5 teams after his 1991 success and retired following the 1995–96 season as a member of the Houston Aeros. After his retirement from hockey he did  color commentary for select Aeros games on their radio and internet broadcasts. 
 
Gamble later took a manager's job with M-I SWACO, a Texas-based company specializing in global oil and gas production. The work took him on trips through the Middle East, including three years' residence in Libya.

Family tragedy
On March 11, 2010, it was reported that Troy's son Garrett Gamble was killed in Afghanistan while serving as a member of the United States Marine Corps. After attending Stephen F. Austin High in Sugar Land, Texas, Gamble joined the Marine Corps and a family friend stated that “This was something he wanted to do, even before he got out of high school,” and that “He was anxious to go.” In October 2009 Gamble was sent to Afghanistan as a SAW gunner near the front lines. Gamble, 20, was killed after stepping on a land mine device while on patrol in Helmand province, Afghanistan.

Career statistics

Regular season and playoffs

Awards
 WHL East First All-Star Team – 1985
 WHL West First All-Star Team – 1988

References

External links

1967 births
Canadian ice hockey goaltenders
Cincinnati Cyclones (IHL) players
Hamilton Canucks players
Houston Aeros (1994–2013) players
Ice hockey people from Nova Scotia
Kalamazoo Wings (1974–2000) players
Living people
Medicine Hat Tigers players
Milwaukee Admirals (IHL) players
People from New Glasgow, Nova Scotia
Spokane Chiefs players
Vancouver Canucks draft picks
Vancouver Canucks players